Tanjung Langsat is a main industrial area and port in Pasir Gudang, Johor Bahru District, Johor, Malaysia.

An onshore oil terminal was constructed at the area, with a total oil-storage capacity of 530 000m³ installed by March 2010.

References 

Pasir Gudang
Populated places in Johor